Lukas Van Ness (born July 6, 2001) is an American football defensive end for the Iowa Hawkeyes.

Early life and high school
Van Ness was born on July 6, 2001, in Barrington, Illinois. He later attended Barrington High School, where he played football and ice hockey. He was rated a three-star recruit and committed to play college football at Iowa over offers from Illinois, Minnesota, and Kansas.

College career
Van Ness redshirted his true freshman season at Iowa. Playing both defensive end and defensive tackle, he became a starter as a redshirt freshman and had 33 tackles, 8.5 tackles for loss, and seven sacks. At the end of the season, Van Ness was named a Freshman All-American by the Football Writers Association of America. During his redshirt sophomore season, he was named the Big Ten Conference Special Teams Player of the Week after blocking two kicks in a 10-7 loss to Iowa State.

References

External links
Iowa Hawkeyes bio

2001 births
Living people
Players of American football from Illinois
American football defensive ends
Iowa Hawkeyes football players